Leonardo "Léo" de Andrade Silva (born 18 April 1998) is a Brazilian professional footballer who plays as a defender for Russian Premier League club Khimki.

Professional career
Andrade made his professional debut with Coritiba in a 1-0 Campeonato Paranaense win over União on 28 January 2018. On 31 July 2019, Andrade joined Marítimo.

On 27 January 2023, Marítimo announced Andrade's transfer to the Russian club Khimki. Khimki announced a year-and-a-half-long contract with Andrade on 9 February 2023.

References

External links
 
 Fora de Jogo Profile
 BDFutbol Profile

1998 births
Footballers from Curitiba
Living people
Brazilian footballers
Coritiba Foot Ball Club players
Sociedade Esportiva e Recreativa Caxias do Sul players
C.S. Marítimo players
FC Khimki players
Primeira Liga players
Campeonato de Portugal (league) players
Campeonato Brasileiro Série B players
Russian Premier League players
Association football defenders
Brazilian expatriate footballers
Brazilian expatriate sportspeople in Portugal
Expatriate footballers in Portugal
Brazilian expatriate sportspeople in Russia
Expatriate footballers in Russia